Mantidactylus cowanii is a species of frog in the family Mantellidae. The species is endemic to Madagascar.

References

cowanii
Amphibians described in 1882
Endemic fauna of Madagascar